Robert Joseph Wellman (July 15, 1925 – December 20, 1994) was an American professional baseball player, manager and scout. He managed for a quarter-century in minor league baseball, winning more than 1,600 games — with his 1966 Spartanburg Phillies setting a Western Carolinas League record by ripping off a 25-game winning streak. He also briefly played Major League Baseball.

Wellman was a native of Norwood, Ohio. The rest of Wellman's uniformed career would be spent in the minors, first as a player (he led his league in home runs over four consecutive seasons, 1954–1957, including the Class A Western International League), then as a playing manager and manager.

His managing career began in 1955 with the Douglas Trojans, a Class D affiliate of the Cincinnati Reds in the Georgia State League, where his club finished in first place but fell in the playoffs. He would handle teams in the farm systems of the Reds (1955–1959), Philadelphia Phillies (1961–1976) and New York Mets (1977–1980), compiling a win–loss record of 1,663 wins, 1,440 defeats (.536) with three playoff championships. His 1966 Spartanburg squad — which featured future major leaguers Larry Bowa, Denny Doyle, Barry Lersch, Ron Allen and Lowell Palmer — won 91 of 126 regular-season games, a .722 winning percentage (equivalent to 117 victories over a 162-game season). However, he spent only part of one season as a manager at the Triple-A level, with the 1970 Eugene Emeralds of the Pacific Coast League, and was released on May 25 after his team dropped 28 of its first 43 games. The next year, he resumed his success in Spartanburg.

After leading the 1980 Jackson Mets into the Texas League playoffs, Wellman hung up his uniform and became a Mets scout. He died in Villa Hills, Kentucky, at the age of 69.

References

 Johnson, Lloyd, ed., The Minor League Register. Durham, North Carolina: Baseball America, 1994.

External links
Baseball Reference – major league statistics
Baseball Reference – minor league statistics

1925 births
1994 deaths
Baseball players from Ohio
Buffalo Bisons (minor league) players
Centauros de Maracaibo players
Charleston Senators players
Douglas Trojans players
Eugene Emeralds managers
Graceville Oilers players
Huntington Jewels players
Lincoln A's players
Major League Baseball first basemen
Major League Baseball outfielders
Martinsville A's players
Moultrie Reds players
New York Mets scouts
Norfolk Tides managers
Ottawa A's players
Reading Phillies managers
Philadelphia Athletics players
Savannah Indians players
Savannah Redlegs players
Savannah Reds players
Syracuse Chiefs players
Seattle Rainiers players
Tallassee Indians players
Vancouver Capilanos players
Yakima Bears players